Kimarni Smith (born 14 March 1998) is an English footballer who currently plays for San Antonio FC in the USL Championship.

Career

Basford United
Smith played with the Nottingham-based Southern Football League side Basford United's academy as a youngster, as well as appearing for the club's first team during their 2014–15 season.

Sheffield United
Ahead of a 1 January 2016 move, Smith signed a professional contract with Sheffield United on 6 December 2015. Whilst with Sheffield United, Smith had a brief loan stint with National League North side Gainsborough Trinity in January 2017.

College & amateur
Following his release from Sheffield United in the summer of 2018, Smith moved to the United States to play college soccer at Clemson University. Whilst at Clemson, Smith scored 26 goals and tallied 11 assists in 63 appearances for the Tigers. Honours earned at Clemson included Second-team All-America, First-team All-South Region, and First-team All-ACC in 2019, and First-team All-ACC in 2020.

During the 2019 season, Smith also played with National Premier Soccer League side Greenville FC, making six appearances and scoring a single goal.

D.C. United
On 21 January 2021, Smith was selected 4th overall in the 2021 MLS SuperDraft by D.C. United.  He officially signed with the club on 8 March 2021. He made his debut on 24 April 2021, appearing as a 70th-minute substitute in a 1–0 loss to New England Revolution.

On 25 June 2021, Smith was loaned to D.C. United's USL Championship affiliate side Loudoun United. Following the 2022 season, his contract option was declined by D.C. United.

References 

1998 births
Living people
English footballers
Basford United F.C. players
Sheffield United F.C. players
Gainsborough Trinity F.C. players
Clemson Tigers men's soccer players
D.C. United players
Loudoun United FC players
D.C. United draft picks
San Antonio FC players
National Premier Soccer League players
Association football forwards
English expatriate footballers
English expatriate sportspeople in the United States
Expatriate soccer players in the United States
National League (English football) players
Footballers from Nottingham
Major League Soccer players
USL Championship players